Live in Armenia is a 2011 double live album by British rock group Uriah Heep, comprising a live 2-CD set and corresponding DVD.

Track listing

CD 1
"Wake the Sleeper" – 3:32
"Overload" – 5:57
"Tears of the World" – 4:44
"Stealin'" – 6:45
"Book of Lies" – 4:03
"Gypsy" – 4:31
"Look at Yourself" – 5:07
"What Kind of God" – 6:36
"Angels Walk with You" – 5:23
"Shadow" – 3:35

CD 2
"July Morning" – 10:36
"Easy Livin'" – 3:01
"Sunrise" – 4:04
"Sympathy" – 4:44
"Lady in Black" – 7:09

The DVD track listing is the same as the CDs.

Personnel
Uriah Heep
 Mick Box – guitar, backing vocals
 Trevor Bolder – bass guitar, backing vocals
 Phil Lanzon – keyboards, backing vocals
 Bernie Shaw – lead vocals
 Russell Gilbrook – drums, backing vocals

References

Live in Armenia – The Official Uriah Heep Site
Группа Uriah Heep скоро выпустит альбом Live in Armenia

2011 live albums
2011 video albums
Uriah Heep (band) live albums
Frontiers Records live albums
Frontiers Records video albums
Albums produced by Mike Paxman